Saint-Romain-de-Popey is a commune in the Rhône department in eastern France.

Sites and Monuments
 Château d'Avauges 
 Chapelle de Clévy

See also
Communes of the Rhône department

References

Communes of Rhône (department)